The Lindenwood Lions women's basketball team represents Lindenwood University in St. Charles, Missouri, United States. The Lions currently compete in the Division I Ohio Valley Conference. They formerly played in the Mid-America Intercollegiate Athletics Association from 2012 to 2019 and the Great Lakes Valley Conference from 2019 to 2022. Due to the NCAA's policy on reclassifying programs, the Lions will not be eligible to compete in the NCAA tournament until the 2026–27 season. The Lions will be eligible to play in the WNIT, which unlike its men's counterpart is not operated by the NCAA. 

The team is currently led by fourth-year head coach Katie Falco and play their home games at Robert F. Hyland Performance Arena.

Postseason

NCAA Division II
The Lions made two appearances in the NCAA Division II women's basketball tournament, with a combined record of 0–2. They were invited to the 2020 NCAA Division II Tournament, but that tournament was never played.

NAIA Division I
The Lions made three appearances in the NAIA Division I women's basketball tournament, with a combined record of 0–3.

See also
 Lindenwood Lions men's basketball

References

External links
Website